Mark A. Lamport (born November 23, 1955) is professor of practical theology at graduate schools in the United States and Europe. He is the editor of the Encyclopedia of Christian Education which was the award winner of the Booklist Editors' Choice: Adult Books, 2016, and the author of over 150 publications. He is coeditor of Encyclopedia of Christianity and the Global South, Encyclopedia of Martin Luther and the Reformation, Encyclopedia of Christianity in the United States and the Encyclopedia of Christian Education.

Life

Education 

Lamport holds a Ph.D. from the Michigan State University, a Th.M. from the Princeton Theological Seminary, a M.Div from the Evangelical Theological Seminary, a M.A. from the Wheaton College Graduate School and a B.A. from Huntingdon College.

Teaching 

He is graduate professor in schools in Arizona, California, Colorado, Indiana, Virginia, Belgium, England, Portugal, Wales and Netherlands. He also has been lecturer in Africa, Asia, Australia and Europe.

Works

References 

Living people
Michigan State University alumni
1955 births